Fesenko is a Ukrainian surname.  Notable people with this name include:

Ivan Fesenko (born 1962), Russian mathematician
Kyrylo Fesenko (born 1986), Ukrainian basketball player
Sergey Fesenko, Sr. (born 1959), Soviet swimmer
Serhiy Fesenko (born 1982), Ukrainian swimmer
Yekaterina Fesenko (born 1958), Soviet hurdler

See also
 

Ukrainian-language surnames